Brice Wembangomo (born 18 December 1996) is a Norwegian professional footballer who plays as a left-back for Eliteserien club Bodø/Glimt. He is of Congolese descent.

Career
He joined Sarpsborg 08 from Sarpsborg FK while a youth player, and made his senior debut in September 2014 against Start. After this one game he was sent on loan to Kvik Halden FK in the entire 2015 season, and to Fredrikstad FK in the latter part of 2016. After this he moved permanently to FK Jerv in 2017 and Sandefjord Fotball in 2019. In June 2020 he played the season opener for Sandefjord, his first first-tier game in six years and his second overall.

Bodø/Glimt
On 3 January 2022, Bodø/Glimt announced that they had signed Wembangomo on a three-year contract that would run until December 2024. His official club debut came on 17 February as a starter at left-back in a 3–1 victory in the UEFA Europa Conference League over Celtic at Celtic Park. He made his debut in the domestic league on the opening day of the season as a starter against Rosenborg in a 2–2 draw, providing an assist for Runar Espejord for Bodø's second goal.

Personal life
He is a younger brother of Hugues Wembangomo.

Career statistics

Club

References

1996 births
Living people
People from Sarpsborg
Norwegian footballers
Sarpsborg FK players
Sarpsborg 08 FF players
Kvik Halden FK players
Fredrikstad FK players
FK Jerv players
Sandefjord Fotball players
FK Bodø/Glimt players
Eliteserien players
Norwegian First Division players
Association football defenders
Democratic Republic of the Congo emigrants to Norway